Village Hall is a drama anthology series made by Granada Television between 1974 and 1975.  It is entirely set in a village hall, with each episode highlighting a different use to which the space is put by local people.  Writers include Jack Rosenthal and the actor Kenneth Cope.

Episodes

Series 1
Produced by Michael Dunlop.

Series 2

Producer: Michael Dunlop.

DVD release
The complete first and second series was released on DVD by Network in 2012

References

External links
 

ITV television dramas
1970s British drama television series
1974 British television series debuts
1975 British television series endings
1970s British anthology television series
Television series by ITV Studios
Television shows produced by Granada Television
English-language television shows